Zai, are Pashtun tribes in Pakistan and Afghanistan. The title of tribe end in Zai and their clans end in Khel. Pashtuns (/ˈpʌʃˌtʊn/, /ˈpɑːʃˌtʊn/, /ˈpæʃˌtuːn/; Pashto: پښتانه, Pəx̌tānə́),[27] also known as Pakhtuns[28] or Pathans,[a] are an Iranian ethnic group[32] who are native to the geographic region of Pashtunistan in the present-day countries of Afghanistan and Pakistan.[33][34] They were historically referred to as Afghans[b] until the 1970s,[40] when the term's meaning evolved into that of a demonym for all residents of Afghanistan, including those outside of the Pashtun ethnicity.

Some of the Pashtun tribes
 Samozai
 Esapzai (ايسپزی)
Kamalzai
 Duryazai
 Alakozai
 Alizai
 Barakzai
 Barozai
 Dawlatzai
 Ghilzai
 Kakar
 Kakazai
 Khudiadadzai
 Khulozai
 Mohammadzai
 Niazi or Niazai
 Nurzai
 Omarzai
 Popalzai
 Sadduzai
 Salarzai
 Stanikzai
 Utmankhel
 Yousafzai
 Zazai

See also 
 Khel
 Pashtun tribes
 Pashtun

Pashtun tribes